Baruq Rural District is in the Central District of Heris County, East Azerbaijan province, Iran. At the National Census of 2006, its population was 1,883 in 475 households. There were 1,863 inhabitants in 515 households at the following census of 2011. At the most recent census of 2016, the population of the rural district was 1,828 in 609 households. The largest of its four villages was Baruq, with 913 people.

References 

Heris County

Rural Districts of East Azerbaijan Province

Populated places in East Azerbaijan Province

Populated places in Heris County